Azospirillum canadense is a nitrogen-fixing bacterium isolated from corn rhizospheres. Its type strain is DS2T (=NCCB 100108T =LMG 23617T).

References

External links

Pérez Castañeda, L. M., MA Cruz Hernández, and A. Mendoza Herrera. "Variabilidad genética de aislamientos no-típicos de Azospirillum brasilense por análisis PCR-RFLP del ADN 16S ribosomal." Phyton (Buenos Aires) 80.1 (2011): 27–34.

External links

LPSN
Type strain of Azospirillum canadense at BacDive -  the Bacterial Diversity Metadatabase

Rhodospirillales
Bacteria described in 2007